Sterculia cochinchinensis is a tree species belonging to the genus Sterculia in the family Malvaceae.  The name is unresolved according to The Plant List.  This species is found in Laos and Vietnam (where it is known as trôm nam [sảng]) and there are no subspecies listed in the Catalogue of Life.

References

External links
 

cochinchinensis
Flora of Indo-China
Trees of Vietnam
Plants described in 1889